ILYSM is the fourth full-length album from American indie rock band Wild Pink.

Track listing

References

2022 albums
Indie rock albums by American artists